Football is the most popular sport, both in terms of participants and spectators, in Moscow. Moscow has several of Russia's significant football clubs, and the city is home to many football clubs.

Introduction
Luzhniki Stadium, It was the home venue of the Russia national football team.

History

Clubs 

There are many successful football clubs in Moscow including FC Spartak Moscow, PFC CSKA Moscow, FC Dynamo Moscow, Lokomotiv Moscow, and Torpedo Moscow.

The table below lists all Moscows clubs.

Moscow City

Moscow Oblast

Honours 
 Soviet and Russian football champion (7)
FC Spartak Moscow (22)
 PFC CSKA Moscow (13)
 FC Dynamo Moscow (11)
 FC Lokomotiv Moscow (3)
 FC Torpedo Moscow (3)

Moscow derby

Stadia 
 Luzhniki Stadium
 Otkrytiye Arena
 VEB Arena
 VTB Arena
 RZD Arena
 Eduard Streltsov Stadium

References

See also
Football in Russia

Football in Moscow
Football clubs in Moscow
PFC CSKA Moscow
FC Dynamo Moscow
FC Lokomotiv Moscow
FC Spartak Moscow
FC Torpedo Moscow